Death of a River Guide is a 1994 novel by Australian author Richard Flanagan. Death of a River Guide was Flanagan's first novel.

Awards
Festival Awards for Literature (SA), National Fiction Award, 1996: winner
Victorian Premier's Literary Award, Shaeffer Pen Prize for First Fiction, 1995: winner
NBC Banjo Awards, NBC Banjo Award for Fiction, 1995: shortlisted
Miles Franklin Literary Award 1995: shortlisted

Notes
This novel has been translated into French (2000), Slovenian (2003), Dutch (2003), Spanish (2003), German (2004), Italian (2005), Polish (2017) and Bulgarian (2018).

Interviews
"The Write Stuff" - interview by Giles Hugo

References

1994 Australian novels
Novels by Richard Flanagan
Novels set in Tasmania
1994 debut novels
Novels set in one day